Nikodije Lunjevica (1881 –) was a cavalry lieutenant of the Royal Serbian Army and a brother of Draga Mašin, the Queen consort of King Aleksandar Obrenović of the Kingdom of Serbia.

Biography 
Nikodije was born in 1881 in Gornji Milanovac, then Principality of Serbia. Nikodije was the second son of Panta Lunjevica, a prefect of the Aranđelovac area, and wife Anđelija (née Koljević). He was one of the seven siblings. He had a brother Nikola, and five sisters, Draga, Hristina, Đina, Ana and Vojka. Nikodije's mother was a dipsomaniac and his father died in a lunatic asylum. Nikodije was the grandson of Nikola Lunjevica, a relative of Princess Ljubica of Serbia and close comrade of her husband Prince Miloš.

After the marriage of his sister Draga to the King Alexander Obrenović, Nikodije and his brother Nikola quickly advanced through ranks in the Serbian Army due to their relations with Draga and were known for their arrogant behaviour towards other officers. As King Alexander and Queen Draga had no heirs, Nikodije was considered the potential heir to the Serbian throne, while it is also considered that Draga's sole thought was "in what way will she use the influence she had on the young King, to be able to hand over Serbia to the despotic rage of her brother". Nikodije was almost always in the presence of the royal couple and King Alexander had to endure swindlers addressing Nikodije with "Your Highness".

He was killed under the orders of his former classmate Vojislav Tankosić in the May Coup, which brought an end to the Obrenović dynasty, along with his sister Draga, brother Nikola, and King Alexander. Because of all the previous humiliations of the army and the people, from the moment of the arrest until the execution, Tankosić addressed Nikodije and Nikola ironically with "Your Highness". 

Lunjevica, along with his family, is buried in the Vujan Monastery.

Portrayal 
Nikodije Lunjevica was played by Aleksandar Srećković in the 1995 Serbian mini-series The End of the Obrenović Dynasty.

References

Literature 

 
 
 
 
 

1881 births
1903 deaths
People from Gornji Milanovac
Obrenović dynasty
Serbian military personnel
Executed Serbian people
1903 murders in Europe
Burials at Serbian Orthodox monasteries and churches